, twenty-four Quakers have ever been elected to the United States Congress, the first being John Chew Thomas in 1799. One Quaker currently serves in the Congress.

Senate

House of Representatives

See also
 List of Buddhist members of the United States Congress
 List of Hindu members of the United States Congress
 List of Jewish members of the United States Congress
 List of Mormon members of the United States Congress
 List of Muslim members of the United States Congress

References

Lists of members of the United States Congress
American Quakers